The wisdom of repugnance or "appeal to disgust", also known informally as the yuck factor, is the belief that an intuitive (or "deep-seated") negative response to some thing, idea, or practice should be interpreted as evidence for the intrinsically harmful or evil character of that thing. Furthermore, it refers to the notion that wisdom may manifest itself in feelings of disgust towards anything which lacks goodness or wisdom, though the feelings or the reasoning of such 'wisdom' may not be immediately explicable through reason.

Origin and usage
The term "wisdom of repugnance" was coined in 1997 by Leon Kass, chairman (2001–2005) of the President's Council on Bioethics, in an article in The New Republic, which was later expanded into a further (2001) article in the same magazine, and also incorporated into his 2002 book Life, Liberty, and the Defense of Dignity. Kass stated that disgust was not an argument per se, but went on to say that "in crucial cases... repugnance is the emotional expression of deep wisdom, beyond reason's power fully to articulate."

The term originated in discussions of bioethics. It is often used by those who accept its underlying premise; i.e., that repugnance does, in fact, indicate wisdom. It is thus often viewed as loaded language, and is primarily used by certain bioconservatives to justify their position.

The concept is also used in the study of controversies such as same-sex marriage, pornography, marijuana legalization, alternative sexualities and legalization of abortion. In all cases, it expresses the view that one's "gut reaction" might justify objecting to some practice even in the absence of a persuasive rational case against that practice.

Criticism
The wisdom of repugnance has been criticized, both as an example of a fallacious appeal to emotion and for an underlying premise which seems to reject rationalism. Although mainstream science concedes that a sense of disgust most likely evolved as a useful defense mechanism (e.g. in that it tends to prevent or prohibit potentially harmful behaviour such as inbreeding, cannibalism, and coprophagia), social psychologists question whether the instinct can serve any moral or logical value when removed from the context in which it was originally acquired.

Martha Nussbaum explicitly opposes the concept of a disgust-based morality. Nussbaum notes that disgust has been used throughout history as a justification for persecution. For example, at various times racism, antisemitism, sexism, and homophobia have all been driven by popular repulsion.

Stephen Jay Gould has remarked that "our prejudices often overwhelm our limited information. [They] are so venerable, so reflexive, so much a part of our second nature, that we never stop to recognize their status as social decisions with radical alternatives—and we view them instead as given and obvious truths."

British bioethicist John Harris replied to Kass's view by arguing that, "there is no necessary connection between phenomena, attitudes, or actions that make us uneasy, or even those that disgust us, and those phenomena, attitudes, and actions that there are good reasons for judging unethical. Nor does it follow that those things we are confident are unethical must be prohibited by legislation or regulation."

The word squick was created within BDSM subculture in reaction to this sort of reasoning, and denotes a "gut reaction" of disgust without the implication of any sort of actual moral judgment.

See also
Appeal to emotion
Ethical intuitionism
Emotivism, which claims that all statements like "X is morally wrong" only express repugnance, not moral facts
Moral panic
Repugnancy costs
Repugnant market
Uncanny valley

References

General references

 Reviewed in The Journal of the American Medical Association (subscription required; access date November 24, 2007)

Bioethics
Appeals to emotion
Causal fallacies
Ignorance
Prejudices